The Indiana University Maurer School of Law is located on the campus of Indiana University in Bloomington, Indiana. The school is named after Michael S. "Mickey" Maurer, an Indianapolis businessman and 1967 alumnus who donated $35 million in 2008. From its founding in 1842 until Maurer's donation, the school was known as the Indiana University School of Law – Bloomington.

The law school is one of two law schools operated by Indiana University, the other being the Indiana University Robert H. McKinney School of Law (IU McKinney) in Indianapolis. Although both law schools are part of Indiana University, each law school is wholly independent of the other.

History and background

Founded in 1842, the Indiana University Maurer School of Law is one of the oldest law schools in the United States. The school is located on the southwest corner of the Indiana University Bloomington campus, which puts it in the center of Bloomington. The school maintains significant alumni bases in Indianapolis, Chicago, Washington D.C., and New York.

Since its founding, the law school has produced many notable alumni, including an Associate Justice of the Supreme Court, the current Chief Justice of Indiana, numerous state supreme court justices, and federal appellate and district court judges. The school's library, named for the American legal scholar and Indiana University law professor Jerome Hall,  is one of the largest academic law libraries in the United States with more than 450,000 volumes. The library is primarily for the use of law school faculty and students, but members of the public who need to use the collection are also welcome. Recent enhancements to the library include increased seating and study space, improved "green" lighting systems, and an online institutional repository.

Employment
According to the school's ABA-required disclosures, 83.5% of the Class of 2019 had obtained full-time, long-term, JD-required employment 10 months after graduation.

Costs

The total cost of attendance (including tuition, fees, and living expenses) at the Maurer School of Law for the 2020-2021 academic year is $50,331 for an in-state resident, and $71,006 for a non-Indiana resident. Most students receive some form of financial aid.

Academics

Academic reputation

In its 2022 rankings report released in March 2022, U.S. News & World Report ranked the IU Maurer School of Law 43rd among the nation's "Top 100 Law Schools". The school's programs in tax, intellectual property, business and commercial law, and international law, ranked 17th, 20th, 21st, and 28th, respectively, according to U.S. News.

Admissions
More than 1,500 people applied to join the 2020 fall entering class, with 178 matriculating. The median LSAT and GPA for the entering class were 164 and 3.78. Sixty percent of the incoming class was from outside Indiana, 46% were women, and 20% were minorities. The school has no part-time or evening program; all students are full-time.

Degrees offered
The Juris Doctor (JD) degree is offered, along with 11 joint and dual degrees, including a JD/MBA with the Kelley School of Business and a JD/MPA with the O'Neill School of Public and Environmental Affairs. A master's in cybersecurity law and policy is also available in partnership with the Kelley School and the Luddy School of Informatics, Computing, and Engineering. The school also partners with various schools around the world to offer exchange programs. Graduate degrees are also offered: LLM with or without thesis, SJD, MCL, and a PhD in law and democracy. The LLM course of study provides six areas of specialization.

Experiential education
The Maurer School of Law offers a wide range of experiential education opportunities, including five clinics (community law, conservation, entrepreneurship, intellectual property, and mediation); externships both in the US and abroad, and noncredit pro bono advocacy projects in areas such as immigration, protective orders, inmate assistance, will preparation, and LGBT matters. Students are asked to commit 60 hours of pro bono service during their three years of law school.

Competitions and student organizations
Students compete in several competitions, including Sherman Minton Moot Court Competition, Jessup International Moot Court Competition, Trial Practice Competition, and Negotiations Competition. IU Maurer has more than 30 student organizations, including Intellectual Property Association, International Law Society, and Public Interest Law Foundation. Local chapters of national organizations include the American Constitution Society, Federalist Society for Law and Public Studies, and American Bar Association Law Student Division.

Publications
 Indiana Law Journal
 Indiana Journal of Constitutional Design
 Indiana Journal of Global Legal Studies
 Indiana Journal of Law and Social Equality
 IP Theory

Centers
Center for Constitutional Democracy (CCD) seeks to study and promote constitutional democracy in countries marked by ethnic, religious, linguistic, and other divisions. Founded and directed by John S. Hastings Professor of Law David Williams, the CCD focuses its work in Burma, Liberia, South Sudan, and Libya, training the reform leaders of these countries in constitutionalism, parliamentary process, and legal ordering. The Center focuses its efforts on the constitutional aspects of democratic reform, enabling plural societies to peaceably provide meaningful self-governance to all their citizens. The CCD is the only educational institution in the United States that offers students the chance to work directly and regularly with foreign reform leaders to support constitutional democracy.

Center for Intellectual Property Research supports study in all aspects of intellectual property law and allied fields including patent, trademark, unfair competition, copyright and information policy.

Center for Law, Society, and Culture
The fundamental mission of the Center for Law, Society & Culture is to promote and disseminate a multidisciplinary understanding of law through scholarship, teaching, and discussion. The Center produces, presents, and coordinates research conducted by exceptional scholars in schools and departments across Indiana University on the subject of law and legal problems. The Center supports research related to the law in a broad sense, including cultural aspects of law expressed through political theory and the humanities, and scientific aspects of law expressed through technological advance in biotechnology, environmental science, and information technology.

Milt and Judi Stewart Center on the Global Legal Profession Forces of globalization, politics and the economy create enormous challenges and opportunities for lawyers, clients, policymakers, law schools and the public. The Center on the Global Legal Profession focuses on the role of lawyers in society, the business of lawyering, and the organizational context housing legal practice. The Center's faculty and fellows examine these issues through the lens of empirical research, using original and existing data and utilizing both quantitative and qualitative methodology. The Milton Stewart Fellows are selected in a competitive process each year for internships in India, South Korea, and Brazil under the direction of the Center.

Faculty
Maurer School of Law faculty include former Supreme Court clerks, practicing attorneys from some of the nation's top firms, former U.S. government administrators and legal consultants, former members of international organizations and courts, and visiting professors from around the world. Drawing on their varied experiences and in close collaboration with one another, faculty members consistently produce legal academic work that has a tangible impact on the legal profession. Current tenured and tenured-track faculty include, among others: Nicholas Almendares, Jeannine Bell, Kevin Brown, Hannah L. Buxbaum, Fred Cate, Daniel Cole, Kenneth Dau-Schmidt, Jessica M. Eaglin, Robert L. Fischman, Luis Fuentes-Rohwer, David Gamage, Charles Gardner Geyh, Joseph L. Hoffmann, Mark Janis, Aneil Kovvali, Leandra Lederman, Asaf Lubin, Jody Madeira, Donna M. Nagy, Christina Ochoa, Aviva Orenstein, Steve Sanders,  Jeffrey Stake, Shana Wallace, Deborah Widiss, and Susan Hoffman Williams. 

In addition to the current faculty, the law school's faculty has been honored by the teaching and scholarship of distinguished professors throughout its history. Some of them are:
 Morris S. Arnold, senior-status judge for the U.S. Court of Appeals for the Eighth Circuit; served briefly as dean in the 1980s
 Bernard Gavit, dean of the law school in the 1930s and '40s who guided the school's rise to preeminence
 Julius Getman, nationally known scholar in labor and employment law
 James Hughes, law professor in the 1850s; judge, U.S. Court of Claims
 Paul McNutt, youngest dean in the law school's history; governor of Indiana during the Great Depression; High Commissioner to the Philippines
 Richard M. Milburn, served as Indiana Attorney General after teaching law for twelve years at IU
 S. Jay Plager, dean from 1977–84; secured funding for faculty growth and building expansion; currently Senior Circuit Judge, U.S. Court of Appeals for the Federal Circuit

Notable alumni
IU Maurer counts among its alumni many distinguished leaders in politics, public service, and the judiciary:

 Shirley Abrahamson (1956), Chief Justice, Wisconsin Supreme Court
 Harold Achor (1931) Justice of the Indiana Supreme Court
 Norman Arterburn (1923), Justice of the Indiana Supreme Court
 Birch Bayh (1960), U.S. Senator
 David L. Carden (1976), U.S. Ambassador to ASEAN
 Hoagy Carmichael (1926), American composer
 Franklin Cleckley (1965), First African-American Justice of the West Virginia Supreme Court
 George N. Craig (1932), Governor of Indiana
 Gonzalo P. Curiel (1979), Judge, U.S. District Court for the Southern District of California
 Roger O. DeBruler (1960), Justice of the Indiana Supreme Court
 S. Hugh Dillin (1938), U.S. District Court Judge
 Jesse E. Eschbach (1949), Judge, U.S. Court of Appeals for the Seventh Circuit
 Scott Flanders (1982), CEO of Playboy Enterprises, Inc.
 Fred Gause (1900), Justice of the Indiana Supreme Court
 Brad Gerstner (1996), Founder of Altimeter Capital
 Frank Gilkison (1901), Justice of the Indiana Supreme Court
 Richard Givan (1951), Justice of the Indiana Supreme Court
 Christopher Goff (1996), Justice of the Indiana Supreme Court
 Willis Gorman (1835), U.S. Congressman
 Charles A. Halleck (1924), U.S. Congressman
 Lee H. Hamilton (1956), U.S. Congressman and Chairman of the 9/11 Commission and the Iraq Study Group
 Pamela Jones Harbour (1984), Commissioner of the Federal Trade Commission
 Vance Hartke (1948), U.S. Senator
 John S. Hastings (1924), Judge, U.S. Court of Appeals for the Seventh Circuit
 George Washington Henley (1914), Justice of the Indiana Supreme Court
 Feisal al-Istrabadi (1988), Iraqi UN Ambassador
 Omer Stokes Jackson, (1905) 28th Indiana Attorney General
 Paul G. Jasper (1932), Justice of the Indiana Supreme Court
 William E. Jenner (1930), U.S. Senator
 Michael S. Kanne (1968), Judge, U.S. Court of Appeals for the Seventh Circuit
 Earl Kintner (1938), chair of Federal Trade Commission in the Eisenhower era
 Frederick Landis, Jr. (1934), Justice of the Indiana Supreme Court
 Rodolfo Lozano (1966), U.S. District Court Judge
 Arthur C. Mellette (1866), first Governor of South Dakota and last territorial Governor of the Dakota Territory. 
 Frank McCloskey (1971), U.S. Congressman
 Larry J. McKinney (1969), Chief Judge, U.S. District Court
 J. Emmett McManamon (1934), 33rd Indiana Attorney General
 Sherman Minton (1915), Justice, U.S. Supreme Court; U.S. Senator
 James E. Noland (1948), U.S. District Court Judge
 Frank O'Bannon (1957), Governor of Indiana
 Dixon Prentice (1942), Justice of the Indiana Supreme Court
 Frederick Rakestraw (1947), Justice of the Indiana Supreme Court
 Jeanette Reibman (1940), Pennsylvania State Representative and State Senator
Lauren Robel (1983), Val Nolan Professor of Law, Provost and Executive Vice President at Indiana University.
 Flerida Ruth P. Romero, (LLM 1955), Justice of the Supreme Court of the Philippines
 Loretta H. Rush (1983), Chief Justice of the Indiana Supreme Court
 Curtis G. Shake (1910), Justice of the Indiana Supreme Court
 Geoffrey G. Slaughter (1989), Justice of the Indiana Supreme Court
 George P. Smith II (1964), Law Professor, Lecturer, Scholar
 Shap Smith (1991), Speaker of the Vermont House of Representatives
 William Stewart (1959), Chief Counsel to the National Labor Relations Board
 Jean Stoffregen, lawyer who worked against racial injustice 
 Juanita Kidd Stout, Justice of the Supreme Court of Pennsylvania, first black woman to serve as a state supreme court justice
 Frank Sullivan, Jr. (1982), Associate Justice of the Indiana Supreme Court (retired)
 John V. Sullivan (1977), Parliamentarian of the U.S. House of Representatives
 John D. Tinder (1975), Judge, U.S. Court of Appeals for the Seventh Circuit
 Walter Emanuel Treanor (1922), Judge, U.S. Court of Appeals for the Seventh Circuit and Justice of the Indiana Supreme Court
 Joseph Van Bokkelen (1969), U.S. Attorney for the Northern District of Indiana, U.S. District Court Judge
 Michael Uslan (1976), originator of Batman movie series 
 Richard B. Wathen (1942), Indiana State Representative, journalist and author
 Wendell Willkie (1916), Presidential Candidate

References

External links
 

 

Bloomington, Indiana
Law schools in Indiana
Indiana University
Educational institutions established in 1842
Education in Monroe County, Indiana